Soul Zodiac is the first collaborative studio album by the Nat Adderley Sextet and Rick Holmes, presented by Julian "Cannonball" Adderley. It was released in 1972 through Capitol Records. Recording sessions took place at Independent Recording Studios in Studio City, Los Angeles, California with production handled by David Axelrod and Cannonball Adderley. The album features narration from Rick Holmes on all tracks and contributions from the sextet: Nat Adderley on cornet, George Duke on Fender Rhodes electric piano, Walter Booker on string bass and guitar, Roy McCurdy on drums, Mike Deasy on guitar, and Ernie Watts on flute, tenor saxophone, and tambourine, with guest appearance by Cannonball Adderley on two songs.

The album peaked at number 75 on the Billboard 200 albums chart and at number 11 on the Top R&B/Hip-Hop Albums chart in the United States.

Because of the prominent production credit on the cover, the album is often mistakenly credited to Cannonball Adderley. Also, Soul Zodiac is not to be confused with Cannonball Adderley's Love, Sex, and the Zodiac.

Track listing

Personnel
Nathaniel Carlyle Adderley – cornet
George Duke – Fender Rhodes electric piano
Walter Booker – string bass, guitar
Roy McCurdy – drums
Ernie Watts – tenor saxophone, flute, tambourine
Mike Deasy – guitar
Richard Arthur Holmes, Jr. – narration
Julian "Cannonball" Adderley – alto saxophone (track 2), soprano saxophone (track 3), presenter, producer
David Axelrod – producer
Howard Gale – engineering
John Hoernle – art direction
Richard Rankin – photography

Chart history

References

External links

soul zodiac on Cannonball Adderley's website

1972 albums
Nat Adderley albums
Capitol Records albums
Albums produced by Cannonball Adderley
Albums produced by David Axelrod (musician)
George Duke albums
Collaborative albums